Benjamin Marere (born December 15, 1983 in Zimbabwe), is a Zimbabwean footballer, who currently plays for Manica Diamonds F.C.

International career
The forward is also a member of the Zimbabwe national team, and participated in 13 international matches.

External links

 Benjamin Marere profile at Eurosport

1983 births
Living people
Zimbabwean footballers
Zimbabwe international footballers
Mwana Africa F.C. players
F.C. Platinum players
Dynamos F.C. players
How Mine F.C. players
Black Rhinos F.C. players
Association football wingers